Bayanoun is a town in northern Syria, administratively part of the A'zaz District of Aleppo Governorate, located northwest of Aleppo. Nearby localities include Al-Zahraa and Mayer to the north and Hreitan to the south. According to the Syria Central Bureau of Statistics, Bayanoun had a population of 3,824 in the 2004 census.

References

Populated places in Azaz District